The Maxwell Finland Award for Scientific Achievement is an award given annually by the National Foundation for Infectious Diseases to a scientist who has made "outstanding contributions to the understanding of infectious diseases or public health," based on criteria that include "excellence in clinical and/or research activities; participation in the training of future leaders in the field; and positive impact on the health of humankind." The award is named after epidemiologist Maxwell Finland, who investigated antimicrobial resistance. The first award was given in 1988.

Past winners

See also
 List of biomedical science awards

References

Infectious diseases
Biomedical awards
Awards established in 1988
American awards